Pogogyne douglasii is a species of flowering plant in the mint family known by the common names Douglas' mesamint and Douglas' beardstyle.

The plant is endemic to central California, where it grows in vernal pools and similar grassland habitats in the coastal and interior California Coast Ranges, Sierra Nevada foothills, and the Central Valley.

Description
Pogogyne douglasii is an aromatic annual herb producing a sturdy, erect stem up to about 40 centimeters in maximum height.

The inflorescence is a headlike cluster, each flower accompanied by long, pointed sepals lined densely with long, straight, white hairs. Each lipped tubular flower is 1 to 2 centimeters in length and mostly pinkish-purple with a white throat spotted with purple and sometimes yellow.

References

External links
Jepson Manual Treatment of Pogogyne douglasii
USDA Plants Profile for Pogogyne douglasii (Douglas' mesa mint)
Pogogyne douglasii — UC Photo gallery

douglasii
Endemic flora of California
Flora of the Sierra Nevada (United States)
Natural history of the California chaparral and woodlands
Natural history of the California Coast Ranges
Natural history of the Central Valley (California)
Natural history of the San Francisco Bay Area
Annual plants
Plants described in 1834
Flora without expected TNC conservation status